Aliciella subnuda (synonym Gilia subnuda, common name - coral gilia or carmine gilia) is a biennial or perennial plant in the phlox family (Polemoniaceae) found in the Colorado Plateau and Canyonlands region of the southwestern United States.

Description

Growth pattern
It is a  biennial or perennial plant growing from a basal rosette.

Sticky leaves and stems catch blowing sand and dirt giving them a sandy coating.

Leaves and stems
 lobed leaves are spatula shaped or egg shaped with sticky hairs.

Stems are thin and sticky.

Inflorescence and fruit
It blooms from May to July.

Habitat and range
It can be found in warm desert shrub, pinyon juniper woodland, and ponderosa pine forest communities across the southwestern United States.

Ecological and human interactions
Flowers are pollinated by bees and hummingbirds.

References

subnuda
Flora of the Southwestern United States
Biennial plants
Flora of the Western United States